The Anthology of the Patriarchal Hall is a Chinese text compiled by two Chinese Buddhist monks in 952 during the Five Dynasties and Ten Kingdoms period. It is the oldest existing collection of Chan encounter dialogues, dating from about half a century before the much better-known Transmission of the Lamp. After being lost for centuries, it was rediscovered by Japanese scholars in the 20th century at the Haeinsa temple in Korea, in a complete form with all twenty chapters. The text survived in the form of printing plates made during the 13th century, and not as a printed book. Much like other Chan Buddhist texts, it is written in the form of daily conversations between masters and students or between students themselves.

The Anthology is particularly important for the study of the history of Chinese, as it contains what is believed to be a good record of what vernacular northern Chinese speech was like in the 10th century. An example of a grammatical phenomenon in the text is the use of 也 yě as a marker of the perfect, showing a coalescence of the Classical Chinese particles 也 yě and 矣 yǐ.

僧問居此多少年也。
sēng wèn jū cǐ duōshǎo nián yě
monk ask live PROX more-less year PRF
'The monk asked how many years you've lived here.' (book 4 86.5)

See also 

 Zhuzi yulei
 Middle Chinese

Bibliography 

 
 

Zen texts
10th-century Chinese books
Chinese Buddhist texts
Five Dynasties and Ten Kingdoms literature